The omega equation is a culminating result in synoptic-scale meteorology. It is an elliptic partial differential equation, named because its left-hand side produces an estimate of vertical velocity, customarily expressed by symbol , in a pressure coordinate measuring height the atmosphere. Mathematically, where  represents a material derivative.

Concept and summary 

Vertical wind is crucial to weather and storms of all types. Even slow, broad updrafts can create convective instability or bring air to its lifted condensation level creating stratiform cloud decks. Unfortunately, predicting vertical motion directly is difficult. For synoptic scales in Earth's broad and shallow troposphere, the vertical component of Newton's law of motion is sacrificed in meteorology's primitive equations, by accepting the hydrostatic approximation. Instead, vertical velocity must be solved through its link to horizontal laws of motion, via the mass continuity equation. But this presents further difficulties, because  horizontal winds are mostly geostrophic, to a good approximation. Geostrophic winds merely circulate horizontally, and do not significantly converge or diverge in the horizontal to provide the needed link to mass continuity and thus vertical motion. 

The key insight embodied by the quasi-geostrophic omega equation is that thermal wind balance (the combination of hydrostatic and geostrophic force balances above) holds throughout time, even though the horizontal transport of momentum and heat by geostrophic winds will often tend to destroy that balance. Logically, then, a small non-geostrophic component of the wind (one which is divergent, and thus connected to vertical motion) must be acting as a secondary circulation to maintain balance of the geostrophic primary circulation. The quasi-geostrophic omega  is the hypothetical vertical motion whose adiabatic cooling or warming effect (based on the atmosphere's static stability) would prevent thermal wind imbalance from growing with time, by countering the balance-destroying (or imbalance-creating) effects of advection. Strictly speaking, QG theory approximates both the advected momentum and the advecting velocity as given by the geostrophic wind. 

In summary, one may consider the vertical velocity that results from solving the omega equation as that which would be needed to maintain geostrophy and hydrostasy in the face of advection by the geostrophic wind.

The equation reads:

Its sign and sense in typical weather applications is: upward motion is produced by positive vorticity advection above the level in question (the first term), plus warm advection (the second term).

Derivation

The derivation of the  equation is based on the vertical component of the vorticity equation, and the thermodynamic equation. The vertical vorticity equation for a frictionless atmosphere may be written using pressure as the vertical coordinate:

The thermodynamic equation may be written as:

For the first step, the relative vorticity must be approximated as the geostrophic vorticity:

Expanding the final "tilting" term in  into Cartesian coordinates (although we will soon neglect it), the vorticity equation reads: 

Differentiating with respect to  gives:

Taking the Laplacian of  gives:

Adding to g/f times, substituting , and approximating horizontal advection with geostrophic advection (using the Jacobian formalism) gives:

and

(Singh & Rathor, 1974). Since all advecting velocities in the horizontal have been replaced with geostrophic values, and geostrophic winds are nearly nondivergent, neglect of vertical advection terms is a consistent further assumption of the quasi-geostrophic set, leaving only the square bracketed term in Eqs. (7-8) to enter (1).

Interpretation

Equation (1) for adiabatic   is used by meteorologists and operational weather forecasters to anticipate where upward motion will occur on synoptic charts. For sinusoidal or wavelike motions, where Laplacian operators act simply as a negative sign, and the equation's meaning can be expressed with words indicating the sign of the effect: Upward motion is driven by positive vorticity advection increasing with height (or PVA for short), plus warm advection (or WA for short). The opposite signed case is logically opposite, for this linear equation. 

In a location where the imbalancing effects of adiabatic advection are acting to drive upward motion (where  in Eq. 1), the inertia of the geostrophic wind field (that is, its propensity to carry on forward) is creating a demand for decreasing thickness  in order for thermal wind balance to continue to hold. For instance, when there is an approaching upper-level cyclone or trough above the level in question, the part of  attributable to the first term in Eq. 1 is upward motion needed to create the increasingly cool air column that is required hypsometrically under the falling heights. That adiabatic reasoning must be supplemented by an appreciation of feedbacks from flow-dependent heating, such as latent heat release. If latent heat is released as air cools, then an additional upward motion will be required based on Eq. (9) to counteract its effect, in order to still create the necessary cool core. Another way to think about such a feedback is to consider an effective static stability that is smaller in saturated air than in unsaturated air, although a complication of that view is that latent heating mediated by convection need not be vertically local to the altitude where cooling by  triggers its formation. For this reason, retaining a separate Q term like Equation (9) is a useful approach.

References

External links
 American Meteorological Society definition

Atmospheric dynamics
Partial differential equations